The Battle of Tistedalen was a series of skirmishes in the Swedish–Norwegian War of 1814, at Tistedalen, Norway.

Prelude
At July 30, a Swedish army under Hans Henric von Essen crossed the southern Norwegian border (among them the Régiment Royal-Suédois). A small Norwegian force of a couple hundred men, under Johan Henrik Spørck, withdrew to an advantageous position behind the Tista, at Veden, to delay the Swedes long enough for reinforcements to arrive. Essen sent Eberhard von Vegesack to block the Norwegian fortress of Fredriksten, while a smaller force of 1,500 men under Pehr Brändström marched towards Spørck, in an attempt to force the crossing; after receiving some reinforcements, Spørck's army counted between 400 and 600 men.

Battle
At 1 August, Brändström opened up with two cannons to force the Norwegians to retire but without result; instead he ordered a battalion of the Västmanland Regiment to wade over the river opposite the Norwegian left flank, while other units feinted attacks elsewhere. Once across, the Västmanland battalion launched a bayonet attack which, after two hours of fighting, drove the Norwegians away. The Swedes had lost 3 killed and 13 wounded; the Norwegians had over 27 killed and wounded and 45 men captured. Essen reached Torpum the next day and there united his forces with the Swedish Crown Prince Charles John.

Notes

References

Further reading

Tistedalen
Tistedalen
Tistedalen
Tistedalen
August 1814 events